Lee Frayer (October 2, 1874 – July 25, 1938) was an American racecar driver who competed in the 1911 Indianapolis 500. Driving a Firestone-Columbus automobile, Frayer won a 100-mile race in Columbus, Ohio, defeating, among others, the great Barney Oldfield.

He was born in La Grange, Missouri. His car participated in the 1906 Vanderbilt Cup with Frank Lawell driving.

He participated in the 1911 Indianapolis 500 where he was injured. His relief driver was  future World War I hero Eddie Rickenbacker.

Frayer died at Robinson Memorial Hospital, Ravenna, Ohio on July 25, 1938 following an operation for appendicitis. He was buried in Maple Grove Cemetery in Ravenna, Ohio.

References

Indy 500 results

1874 births
1938 deaths
Indianapolis 500 drivers
People from La Grange, Missouri
Racing drivers from Missouri
Burials in Ohio